Queen of the Streets (German:Die Gassenkönigin) is a 1921 German silent film directed by Ernst Mölter.

Cast
 Traute Trauneck
 Else Andresen 
 Arthur Beder 
 Gertrude De Lalsky 
 Ernst Hallenstein 
 Kurt Hardegg 
 Katherina Kock 
 Erich Moller
 Hermann Wlach as Maler

References

Bibliography
 Hans-Michael Bock and Tim Bergfelder. The Concise Cinegraph: An Encyclopedia of German Cinema. Berghahn Books.

External links

1921 films
Films of the Weimar Republic
German silent feature films
German black-and-white films